Super carrier may refer to:

 Supercarrier, a nickname for the largest aircraft carriers
 Supercarrier (TV series), a 1988 TV series